Seethamma Andalu Ramayya Sitralu is a 2016 Indian Telugu romantic comedy  film written and directed by Gavireddy Srinivas Reddy. Produced by S Sailendra Babu, Sridhar Reddy, Harish Duggishetti . It features Raj Tarun and Arthana in the lead roles and Ranadheer and Raja Ravindra in the supporting roles. The film was released worldwide on 29 January 2016.

Plot
Sri Ram (Raj Tarun) starts loving Seetha mahalakshmi (Arthana) from young age. Sri Ram remains in the village, Seetha goes to the city for higher education and keeps coming to the village for holidays. Sri Ram and Seetha become good friends after a couple of positive incidents.

Sri Ram tries to impress her in many ways and tries to express his love throughout the first half of the movie. Seetha rejects his proposal when she gets to know that Ram loves her. The Second half is more of how Ram wins her love and impresses Seetha's Family with his determination and overcoming some challenges.

Cast

 Raj Tarun as Sri Ram
 Arthana as Seetha Mahalakshmi
 Ranadheer Reddy as Seetha's brother
 N. Shankar as Sri Ram's father
 Raja Ravindra as Seetha's father
 Aadarsh Balakrishna as Seetha's suitor
 Shakalaka Shankar as Sri Ram's friend
 Surekha Vani as Sri Ram's mother
 Sri Lakshmi as Sri Ram's grandmother
 Ananth as Temple priest
 Ratnasagar as Seetha's grandmother
 Sangeetha Reddy as Sruthi
 Mithuna Waliya as Lavanya
 Rajitha as Ranadheer's wife
 Hema
 Joginaidu

Soundtrack
The Song Paravasame was a re-used tune by Gopi Sunder'' From the malayalam film 10:30 am Local Call composed by himself and sung by Sachin Warrier .

References

2010s Telugu-language films
2016 films
Indian romantic comedy films
2016 romantic comedy films